"Saturday Night's Alright for Fighting" (sometimes written "Saturday Night's Alright (For Fighting)") is a song originally recorded by English musician Elton John. John composed it with his long-time songwriting partner Bernie Taupin. It was released on John's best-selling album Goodbye Yellow Brick Road (1973) and as the first single. It has been covered by many artists and featured on motion picture, video game, and television soundtracks.

Billboard found the song to be a cross between John's earlier single "Crocodile Rock" and the Rolling Stones' single "Street Fighting Man", suggesting that it may be a parody of the Rolling Stones but regardless is a "great fun record."

Background
"Saturday Night's Alright for Fighting" is a lively throwback to early rock and roll with a glam edge. The lyrics discuss a night out in town in which the narrator plans to "get about as oiled as a diesel train." Taupin has said that the song was meant to be an American rock and roll song set in Britain. It was inspired by his raucous teenage days and in particular, the fistfights in his local pub, the Aston Arms in Market Rasen.

Composition and recording
The song, which showcases the guitar playing of Davey Johnstone, with lyrics by Bernie Taupin and music by John, is written in the key of G mixolydian alternating with C mixolydian on the chorus. It is one of John's harder-rocking songs (similar to "Grow Some Funk of Your Own" and "The Bitch Is Back"), with a sound echoing bands such as the Who and the Rolling Stones.

It was the only song recorded during Elton and the band's time in Jamaica, where they had initially planned to record the album, but was never used due to the poor quality of the recording equipment. John described it as sounding like "it had been recorded on the worst transistor radio". The experience prompted the band to return to France to finish the album.

"Saturday" is one of the most aggressive and lively rock inspired tracks ever recorded by John. It features energetic, rapid-fire piano playing reminiscent of Jerry Lee Lewis. The song was one of the few John-Taupin songs that Elton said was not a "typical piano number". According to John's recollection in Elizabeth Rosenthal's His Song: The Musical Journey of Elton John, it may have been written on the piano at first, but the song ended up being recorded somewhat in reverse to the normal way he records, with the band putting their tracks down, and Elton overdubbing his piano afterward. (John's typical process was to either record the piano first or play along with the band.) Elton called the song "hard to record".

Apart from his lyrical contributions, in the Eagle Vision documentary, Classic Albums: Goodbye Yellow Brick Road, Taupin said that a lot of the power of the song comes from the chords, adding it also features what he called one of the greatest "strident, blistering guitar chords ever created" in rock and roll.

Release
The song was released in 1973 as the album's first single. Cash Box called the song an "infectious rocker that carries "Crocodile Rock" just one step further."

In the UK, the song entered the Music Week Top 50 the week of 7 July 1973, rose to No. 7, and stayed in the charts for 9 weeks and is one of John's most critically and commercially successful singles on that country.

In the US, the song entered the Billboard Top 40 the week of 11 August 1973, rose to No. 12, and stayed in the Top 40 for nine weeks. It was the only single by Elton John that failed to make the Top 10 in the three-year, 13-hit period between May 1972 ("Rocket Man") and October 1975 ("Island Girl"). It was the only Elton John single that failed to go gold or platinum in the three-year, 11-hit period between December 1972 ("Crocodile Rock") and October 1975 ("Island Girl").

Despite only being a modest success compared to his other hits, it remains one of his best-known songs as the song has been a staple of John's live performances for many years, being played more than 1,800 times live (making it one of John's top ten most performed tracks in his entire discography) as of December 2015.

A live performance featuring American recording artist Anastacia was released in 2000 as part of his live album One Night Only.

Legacy

"Saturday Night's Alright for Fighting" has been covered by W.A.S.P., Flotsam and Jetsam, Nickelback (with Kid Rock and Dimebag Darrell), Queen, the Who, Fall Out Boy, Verbal Abuse, and several others. It has also been sampled in the hit "Gloria" by Umberto Tozzi in 1979.

Track listing
All songs written by Elton John and Bernie Taupin

 "Saturday Night's Alright for Fighting" – 4:12
 "Jack Rabbit" – 1:50
 "Whenever You're Ready (We'll Go Steady Again)" – 2:50

Both B-sides were included later on Rare Masters and issued as bonus tracks on the remastered edition of Don't Shoot Me I'm Only the Piano Player.

Charts and certifications

Personnel
 Elton John – piano, vocals
 Davey Johnstone – electric guitars
 Dee Murray – bass
 Nigel Olsson – drums

References

External links
 "BBC: The Official UK Charts Company". United Kingdom sales chart. Retrieved 11 June 2006.
 "Billboard". Billboard Hot 100 airplay and sales charts. Retrieved 11 June 2006.

Songs about nights
1973 songs
1973 singles
Elton John songs
The Who songs
Nickelback songs
Songs with music by Elton John
Songs with lyrics by Bernie Taupin
Star Academy France songs
Song recordings produced by Gus Dudgeon
DJM Records singles
MCA Records singles
Glam rock songs